Jan Arne Björklund (born 18 April 1962) is a Swedish Liberal politician. He was member of the Riksdag from 2006 to 2019, representing Stockholm County, and served as leader of the Liberals from 2007 to 2019. Björklund served as Minister for Education from 2007 to 2014, and as Deputy Prime Minister of Sweden from 2010 to 2014.

He was designated Swedish Ambassador to Italy on 28 May 2020 and took office on 1 September 2020.

Early life
Björklund was born in Skene (today a part of Mark Municipality), Älvsborg County (today Västra Götaland County), Sweden. His father, Arne, worked in the textile industry; his mother, Ragna, came to Sweden from Norway as a war refugee in 1944. He came from a working class home, and both of his parents lacked higher education.

After he had completed upper secondary education (gymnasium) in 1982, Björklund enlisted in the Swedish Armed Forces, and earned the rank of officer in 1985. He then served in the royal Svea Life Guards in Stockholm, from which he retired as a major in 1994 to start a new career in politics.

Political career
Björklund early became a member of the Liberal Youth of Sweden, the youth wing of the Liberal People's Party, in 1976. He was elected a member of the board of the Liberal Youth in 1983, and served as its second deputy chairman between 1985 and 1987. He has served as a member of the board of the Liberal People's Party since 1990. He joined the party's leadership in 1995, became second deputy chairman in 1997, and first deputy chairman in 2001.

In the 1991 Swedish general election, Björklund was elected as a substitute member of the Stockholm City Council, where he came to serve on the city's board of education. Between 1994 and 1998, he served as an oppositional vice mayor in Stockholm. Between 1998 and 2002, he served as vice mayor for schools, and between 2002 and 2006, he served again as oppositional vice mayor.

In the run-up to both the 2002 and 2006 general elections, Björklund was chairman of the centre-right Alliance for Sweden's working group on education policy.

Government minister and party leader
In the 2006 election, Björklund was elected to the Riksdag; shortly thereafter, he was appointed Minister for Schools in the new centre-right cabinet led by Prime Minister Fredrik Reinfeldt.

Following Lars Leijonborg's decision to retire as party leader at the Liberal People's Party's national meeting in September 2007, Björklund was unanimously nominated by the party's election committee as the new party leader. He was elected new party leader on 7 September 2007. At the same time, he also took over Leijonborg's positions as head of the Ministry of Education and Research, and as Minister for Education. The change in his title as minister was merely formal, as his areas of responsibility were still those that he had as Minister for Schools.

Following the 2010 Swedish general election, in which the Liberal People's Party became the second-largest party in the government coalition, Björklund replaced Maud Olofsson as Deputy Prime Minister of Sweden on 5 October 2010.

Political views 
Björklund is often seen as a representative of the more right-wing, hard-edged faction of the Liberal Party. He has focused most on school issues, where he is known for his support for orderliness and discipline. He has criticized the Swedish schools system for being too "dopey", and not focusing enough on knowledge. Among other things, he has advocated more frequent assessments and a reformed grade system.

In 2002, during the run-up to the U.S. invasion of Iraq, as first deputy chairman of his party, Björklund expressed his support for Swedish participation in the multinational coalition on condition that the invasion received broad international support, which it did not.

In January 2009, Björklund criticised the downsizing in recent years of the Swedish Armed Forces. During an interview on Swedish news program SVT, he stated: "After the last years development in Russia, and the war in Georgia, Sweden must be able to mobilize more soldiers than we can today."

In 2019, Björklund got his wish to abolish the austerity tax (Värnskatten), a top tax rate of 5% points for incomes above €6,000 a month, in turn for supporting Stefan Löfven as prime minister.

Personal life

Björklund married Anette Brifalk in 1992, with whom he has two adopted children, Gustav and Jesper. He lives with his family in Bromma, Stockholm.

He was a celebrity dancer in Let's Dance 2020 to be broadcast on TV4.

Bibliography

References

External links

Jan Björklund at the Swedish government's website
Jan Björklund at the Liberals' website 

1962 births
Leaders of political parties in Sweden
Members of the Riksdag from the Liberals (Sweden)
Living people
Male feminists
Members of the Riksdag 2006–2010
Members of the Riksdag 2010–2014
Members of the Riksdag 2014–2018
Members of the Riksdag 2018–2022
People from Mark Municipality
Swedish Army officers
Swedish feminists
Swedish Ministers for Schools
Swedish Ministers for Education
Swedish people of Norwegian descent